Isarwara or Isurwara (Village ID 460845) is a town in Sagar district of Madhya Pradesh, India.

Cities and towns in Sagar district